Pish Sheshar (also Romanized as Pīsh Sheshār; also known as Pīshehshār) is a village in Goli Jan Rural District, in the Central District of Tonekabon County, Mazandaran Province, Iran. At the 2006 census, its population was 40, in 11 families.

References 

Populated places in Tonekabon County